20 Golden Greats is a greatest hits album by Nat King Cole. It was released by Capitol Records in 1978 and reached number one on the UK Albums Chart, where it was a posthumous number one.

Track listing

Chart performance

Certifications

References

1978 compilation albums
Capitol Records compilation albums
Nat King Cole compilation albums